The Norddeutsche Neueste Nachrichten (NNN) is a newspaper distributed in Rostock, Mecklenburg-Vorpommern, Germany. It is affiliated with the Schweriner Volkszeitung. The controlling company, NNN Norddeutsche Neueste Nachrichten GmbH, has its head office in Rostock.

References

External links

 Norddeutsche Neueste Nachrichten
 ZDB-ID: 42750-0 Norddeutsche Neueste Nachrichten." German National Library.

German-language newspapers
Mass media in Rostock
Newspapers published in Germany